Eutelia favillatrix is a moth of the family Noctuidae. It is found in Ethiopia, Kenya and Zimbabwe.

References

External links

Moths of Asia
Moths described in 1858
Euteliinae